Status of the Gaelic language may refer to:

 Status of the Irish language

See also
 Gaelic revival, a 19th-century movement to foster use of the Irish language